Mighty Max may refer to:

 Mighty Max (toyline), a series of toys from Bluebird Toys
 Mighty Max (TV series), a television series based on the toys
 Max Weinberg, an American drummer and television personality
 Mitsubishi Mighty Max, a pickup truck sold by Mitsubishi Motors